Inositol trisphosphate receptor (InsP3R) is a membrane glycoprotein complex acting as a Ca2+ channel activated by inositol trisphosphate (InsP3). InsP3R is very diverse among organisms, and is necessary for the control of cellular and physiological processes including cell division, cell proliferation, apoptosis, fertilization, development, behavior, learning and memory. Inositol triphosphate receptor represents a dominant second messenger leading to the release of Ca2+ from intracellular store sites. There is strong evidence suggesting that the InsP3R plays an important role in the conversion of external stimuli to intracellular Ca2+ signals characterized by complex patterns relative to both space and time, such as Ca2+ waves and oscillations.

Discovery

The InsP3 receptor was first purified from rat cerebellum by neuroscientists Surachai Supattapone and Solomon Snyder at Johns Hopkins University School of Medicine.

The cDNA of the InsP3 receptor was first cloned in the laboratory of Katsuhiko Mikoshiba.  The initial sequencing was reported as an unknown protein enriched in the cerebellum called P400.  The large size of this open reading frame indicated a molecular weight similar to the protein purified biochemically, and soon thereafter it was confirmed that the protein p400 was in fact the inositol trisphosphate receptor.

Distribution
The receptor has a broad tissue distribution but is especially abundant in the cerebellum. Most of the InsP3Rs are found integrated into the endoplasmic reticulum.

Structure 
Several X-ray crystallographic  and electron cryomicroscopic (cryo-EM)  structures of IP3Rs from mouse, rat, and human have defined the overall architecture of the channel. The 1.2 MDa C4-symmetric assembly consists of an ER-embedded transmembrane domain (TMD) in a domain-swapped 6 transmembrane (6TM) cation channel fold that is capped by a large cytosolic domain (CD). In this manner, IP3Rs share significant homology with the much larger and distantly-related RyRs. The CD contains all known ligand binding sites, including the IP3 binding site, two Ca2+ binding sites, an adenine nucleotide binding site, and a C2H2 Zn2+ finger fold. A comprehensive Ca2+-dependent conformational landscape has recently been defined by cryo-EM.

See also 
 Inositol
 Inositol phosphate
 Inositol monophosphate
 Inositol trisphosphate
 Inositol pentakisphosphate
 Inositol hexaphosphate
 MRVI1 associated through complex formation.

References

External links 
 

Signal transduction
Transmembrane receptors
Inositol